The 23rd Empire Awards ceremony (officially known as the Rakuten Empire Awards), presented by the British film magazine Empire, honored the best films of 2017. The ceremony took place on 18 March 2018 in London, England at the Roundhouse Theatre. The nominees were announced on 18 January 2018.

These are the last Empire Awards to be held so far.

Winners and nominees
Winners are listed first and highlighted in boldface.

Multiple awards

The following films received multiple awards:

Multiple nominations
The following films received multiple nominations:

References

Empire Award ceremonies
2017 film awards
2018 in London
2018 in British cinema
March 2018 events in the United Kingdom